The 2015 Kwai Tsing District Council election was held on 22 November 2015 to elect all 29 elected members to the 30-member Kwai Tsing District Council.

The pan-democracy camp failed to secure majority of the elected seats with Democratic Party lost its largest party status to the Democratic Alliance for the Betterment and Progress of Hong Kong (DAB).

Overall election results
Before election:

Change in composition:

References

External links
 Election Results - Overall Results

2015 Hong Kong local elections